Neoregelia spectabilis, the fingernail plant, is a species of flowering plant in the family Bromeliaceae, native to the South Brazilian rainforest.

The specific epithet spectabilis means showy or spectacular.

It has gained the Royal Horticultural Society's Award of Garden Merit.

Cultivars
 Neoregelia 'Black Knight'
 Neoregelia 'Black Spectabilis'
 Neoregelia 'Bromel-La'
 Neoregelia 'Fiesta'
 Neoregelia 'Inspiration'
 Neoregelia 'Julian Nally'
 Neoregelia 'Lady Racine'
 Neoregelia 'Magenta Dalmatian'
 Neoregelia 'Marcon'
 Neoregelia 'Mary Jo'
 Neoregelia 'Nice Surprise'
 Neoregelia 'Pinkie'
 Neoregelia 'Pinstripe'
 Neoregelia 'Red On Green'
 Neoregelia 'Sincerely'
 Neoregelia 'Spectaline'
 Neoregelia 'Spectaroan'
 Neoregelia 'Spotted Imp'
 Neoregelia 'Thunderball'
 × Neobergia 'Perneri'
 × Neomea 'Pink Cascade'
 × Neotanthus 'Charlien Rose'
 × Neotanthus 'Tom Montgomery'
 × Niduregelia 'Sunset'

References

BSI Cultivar Registry Retrieved 11 October 2009

Flora of Brazil
Flora of South America
spectabilis